The 2012 Indonesia Super League U-21 second stage is contested by a total of 10 teams.

The draw for the group stage was held at the PT. Liga Indonesia house in Jakarta, Indonesia on 8 June 2012. Round I of second stage started 15 June 2012 to ended on 23 June 2012.

In each group, teams play each other home-and-away in a round-robin format, but all the match was held at the same stadium with a home tournament. The winners and runners-up of each group advance to the semifinal.

Group I

All matches were played in Surajaya Stadium, Lamongan.

Group II

All matches were played in Mandala Stadium, Jayapura.

References

External links
Indonesia Super League U-21 Result 

Second stage